Pacatuba is a municipality located in the Brazilian state of Sergipe. Its population was 14,540 (2020) and its area is 364 km².

The municipality contains part of the  Santa Isabel Biological Reserve, a strictly protected conservation unit created in 1988.

References

Municipalities in Sergipe